Zoltán Kovács (born 24 August 1977) is a Hungarian weightlifter. He competed at the 2000 Summer Olympics and the 2004 Summer Olympics.

References

1977 births
Living people
Hungarian male weightlifters
Olympic weightlifters of Hungary
Weightlifters at the 2000 Summer Olympics
Weightlifters at the 2004 Summer Olympics
Sportspeople from Budapest
21st-century Hungarian people